Maurie McLeish (5 June 1899 – 28 August 1972) was an Australian rules footballer who played with St Kilda in the Victorian Football League (VFL).

Notes

External links 

1899 births
1972 deaths
Australian rules footballers from Victoria (Australia)
St Kilda Football Club players